Virgil K Smith (born December 18, 1979) is a Democratic former member of the Michigan House of Representatives and Michigan Senate. Smith previously represented the 4th Senate district, which is composed of Allen Park, Lincoln Park, Southgate and the north side of Detroit. From 2003 to 2008, Smith represented State House district 7, comprising the northern tier of Detroit.

Personal life
Smith is the son of Third Judicial Circuit of Michigan of retired Chief Judge and former Michigan State Senator Virgil C. Smith.

On May 6, 2009, Smith married Anistia Thomas. Smith filed for divorce in July 2009, citing a marital breakdown beyond repair. Thomas denied that there was a breakdown in the marriage and counter-sued for an annulment. Smith later consented to his wife's request for the annulment, which Wayne County Circuit Judge Charlene Elder granted on October 6, 2009. The couple have no children.

Smith and Thomas consented to an intimate relationship after the annulment, prior to a May 2015 incident at Smith's home, where Smith accused Thomas of intruding at his property, which resulted in Smith shooting at Thomas' vehicle.

Education
Smith did his undergraduate studies at Michigan State University earning a degree in political science.  He received his master's degree in public administration from Western Michigan University.

Criminal and civil history

Minor in possession of alcohol
In 2000, Smith was arrested for minor in possession of alcohol, according to Michigan Secretary of State spokesman Fred Woodhams.

Impaired driving
Smith's license was revoked in 2004 after being charged for operating while impaired February 2004 and operating while intoxicated in August 2004. His license was reinstated in 2008.

In 2010, Smith was pulled over by Detroit police for speeding. The officer detected a “strong odor of intoxicants.”  Wayne County Prosecutor Kym Worthy recused herself from the case, citing a "potential conflict" involving Smith's father. The case was then sent to the Washtenaw County Prosecutors office who decided not to move forward with charges because, Smith's BAC ratio at the time of the stop was under the legal limit.

Malicious destruction of property
On May 10, 2015, Smith was charged with domestic violence, malicious destruction of property and felonious assault after an altercation between him and his ex-wife, Anistia Thomas at his home in the 18600 block of Wexford, on Detroit's east side. The charges of felonious assault and domestic violence were dismissed on August 29, 2020 citing insufficient evidence.

On the morning of May 10, 2015, at approximately 1:00 a.m., Thomas arrived to Smith's home unannounced, after not being able to get in contact with Smith via phone that evening. Smith, who was inside the home was asleep in his bed with another woman. Thomas banged on Smith's bedroom window requesting him to come outside of the home. Smith was awaken by the pounding at the window and met Thomas at the side door in sweatpants and a t-shirt and Thomas forced her way inside of Smith's home. According to Thomas's first police report, Thomas alleged that Smith met her at the door naked with another woman.

After Thomas was inside the home, she discovered another woman in Smith's bed. A fight followed, during which Smith was trying to refrain Thomas from attacking his guest. According to Thomas's police report Smith punched her in the face four to five times, which caused swelling and that Smith rammed Thomas' head into the floor and wall, which caused Thomas to fall into a TV.  Thomas then alleged Smith put his arm into the back of her neck, preventing her from breathing. Thomas then left the home, and fell over railing causing her to hit her face on the concrete.

According to Thomas's police report, when she got up, Smith was "holding a big gun in the air". Smith then fired several shots into Thomas's 2015 Mercedes Benz GLA250. Thomas ran into a nearby alley and fled into the nearby home of Smith's neighbor, “who allowed her to call 911 and clean her wounds.” The neighbor later tried to retrieve vehicle, but it was “unable to start due to gunshot damage." Evidence technicians later found three bullet holes in the vehicle's hood; two in the driver's side headlight; two in the driver's side front fender; and one each in the driver's side door, windshield, and rear driver's door pillar. Smith called it the stupidest thing he had done in his life.

On May 12, 2015, Thomas requested a personal protection order (PPO) against Smith, which was authorized. In the application, Smith alleged two additional domestic violence incidents involving Smith: one in 2007, the other in 2008, but cited in the request she did not call authorities for either alleged incident.

In March 2016, Prosecutors agreed to a plea deal with Smith, dismissing two felonies, including a count of possessing a firearm during the commission of a felony, which carries a mandatory two-year prison sentence, and the felonious assault. The misdemeanor count of domestic violence was dismissed also. Smith plead guilty to a felony count of malicious destruction of personal property of $20,000 or more. Part of the agreement called for Smith to resign from his job as a legislator and too not hold public office during the five years of his probation.

On March 14, 2016, Smith was sentenced to 10 months in jail with no early release.  He was also sentenced to five years of probation, ordered to stay away from alcohol, comply with mental health treatment and to have no contact with his ex-wife.

During sentencing, Wayne County Circuit Judge Lawrence Talon ruled that he did not have the authority to impose Smith's resignation as a condition of sentence and removed it from the plea agreement. Talon stated on the record that Smith could be expelled, voted out of office or resign, but requiring him to step down violated the state constitution. Prosecutor Worthy asked Judge Talon to vacate the plea deal, in response to the elimination of the resignation requirement.  Judge Talon disagreed and argued that vacating the plea agreement would not serve in "the interests of justice and accepted the modified plea."

Talon's ruling allowed Smith to receive his $71,685 annual salary plus benefits while serving time in the County jail. On March 31, 2016, Smith submitted a letter of resignation to the Michigan Senate, effective April 12, 2016. Smith was released from jail in December 2016.

As a result of Talon's ruling, Smith decided to run for the Detroit City Council, causing Prosecutor Worthy to appeal the ruling in an attempt to keep Smith off the ballot.

In August 2017, the Michigan appeals court upheld Judge Talon's ruling in a 2-1 decision. Judges Deborah Servitto and Michael Kelly said it would be “coercion” to allow prosecutors to try to negotiate a politician's future as part of a plea deal. In dissent, Judge Michael Riordan said the plea deal should have been set aside at the prosecutor's request, after Judge Talon stripped some key conditions.

Prosecutor Worthy appealed the ruling to the Michigan Supreme Court, asking them to decide the issue of whether it's a violation of the separation of powers for a judge to essentially sign off on an agreement that prohibits a person from running for office. On January 11, 2018, the Supreme Court heard arguments regarding Smith's eligibility to run for political office. The Supreme Court ruled in June 2018, the prosecutor did not have the authority to include terms inside the plea agreement that Smith could not hold public office or to force his resignation because it would "offend public policy."

Political career

2002 House election
Smith won the Democratic primary in 2002 against former state senator Henry Stallings II.

2010 Senate election
In 2010 Smith defeated former House Appropriations Committee Chair George Cushingberry in the August Primary to fill the Michigan Senate seat formerly held by Samuel "Buzz" Thomas, who left due to term limits.

2014 Senate election
Smith was re-elected in 2014 to a second four-year term after defeating former state Rep. Rashida Tlaib in the Democratic Primary. Smith resigned from the state Senate in April 2016 after his guilty plea for shooting at his ex-wife's Mercedes-Benz in May 2015.

2017 Detroit City Council election
The Detroit City Clerk's office issued petitions for Smith to run for City Council, district 2, on April 7, 2017. Smith finished second in the August primary, where he faced Roy McCalister Jr. on the general election ballot. Smith went on to lose the general election to McCalister.

See also
Michigan House of Representatives
Michigan Senate
Michigan Democratic Party

External links

Campaign Finance
Voting Records

References

1979 births
Living people
21st-century American politicians
Politicians from Detroit
African-American state legislators in Michigan
Democratic Party Michigan state senators
Democratic Party members of the Michigan House of Representatives
Michigan politicians convicted of crimes
Michigan State University alumni
Western Michigan University alumni
21st-century African-American politicians
20th-century African-American people